Rosemont is a neighborhood in the western part of Baltimore, Maryland. Located below North Avenue, above Franklintown Road, East of Hilton Parkway, and West of Bloomingdale Avenue it is a working class African-American neighborhood.

It is immediately adjacent to Walbrook Junction and Leakin Park. Though the area was once considered middle-class, it has in the last century experienced economic depression, housing abandonment, and increased crime. The neighborhood was affected by the Baltimore riot of 1968.

External links
Rosement demographic profile
Baltimore '68: Riots and Rebirth

African-American history in Baltimore
Neighborhoods in Baltimore
West Baltimore
Working-class culture in Baltimore